Paramita Rahayu Abdurachman (29 February 1920 – 24 March 1988), also known as Jo Abdurachman, was an Indonesian historian and social worker who served as the secretary-general of the Indonesian Red Cross Society for nearly a decade. After her retirement from the organization, she became a researcher at the Indonesian Institute of Sciences, studying the history of the Maluku Islands using Spanish and Portuguese colonial archives.

Biography 
Paramita Rahayu was born in Buitenzorg (Bogor), in the former Dutch East Indies (Indonesia), on 29 February 1920. Paramita's family of bureaucrats held a higher position in society and had access to Western education, allowing her to attend an HBS secondary school typically reserved for the Indonesian elite. She was the niece of Achmad Soebardjo, Indonesia's first foreign minister, and the cousin of journalist Herawati Diah and archeologist Satyawati Suleiman.

References

Citations

Bibliography 

 

1920 births
1988 deaths
20th-century Indonesian historians
Indonesian social workers